Dave "Rave" Ogilvie is a Canadian record producer, mixer, songwriter and musician. The former member of bands Skinny Puppy and Jakalope started his recording career in Vancouver working as an engineer at Mushroom Studios. He has been described by SPIN as the "engineer" of Marilyn Manson's Antichrist Superstar (1996) album.

Dave has worked with many artists over his extensive career including Carly Rae Jepsen, Marianas Trench, Tool, Nine Inch Nails, Marilyn Manson, 54-40, Queen, David Bowie, Skinny Puppy, Spineshank, KMFDM, Front Line Assembly, Doughboys, The Birthday Massacre, Jakalope, Queensrÿche, Men Without Hats, Left Spine Down, Xavier Rudd, Sloan, All Systems Go!, Coal Chamber, Treble Charger, Stereos, Ministry, SNFU, The Grapes of Wrath, Mötley Crüe and countless more.

References

External links
A Dave "Rave" Ogilvie discography

Canadian industrial musicians
Canadian record producers
Musicians from Vancouver
Skinny Puppy members
Living people
Jakalope members
1960 births